The Misun-Hyosun vigil was the very first candlelight vigils held in South Korea to commemorate and protest the death of two schoolgirls. Hyosun and Misun were two middle school students who were killed by the U.S. military vehicle, known as the Yangju highway incident.

Background

Yangju highway incident 
On June 13th, 2002, two 14-years-old girls, Shin Hyo-sun and Shim Mi-seon were killed by U.S. military vehicle on the Yangju Highway 56, in an accident known as the Yangju highway incident. American soldiers were training with the Armored Vehicle Launched Bridge on the highway where they hit the two girls, which caused their immediate deaths.

South Korea and the U.S. have the Status of the Forces Agreement (SOFA) which meant the U.S. had jurisdiction over this incident. The drivers of the military vehicle were pronounced innocent in 2002 under the U.S. military tribunal. This angered South Koreans and incited them to create the candlelight vigils.

Controversy
The early controversial issue in this incident was whether the vehicle driver saw the girls or not. The U.S.' 2nd Infantry Division emphasized that the incident was "the tragic incident which was never intentional or malicious." The U.S. military authority insists that the structure of the vehicle causes a blind spot in its right side, and that the controller saw the girls and tried to inform the driver. Moreover, due to the communications disruption, the driver did not hear the radio and hit the two girls. The 2nd Infantry Division also reported that the vehicle was driving straight—not driving over the centerline—at a speed of 8 to 16 km per hour, and another armored vehicle that was facing each other stopped at a point 1m away from the accident vehicle.

Some questions arose after this announcement such as that visibility may be secured depending on the direction of the driver's head, as well as disputing that it is difficult to have the alleged communication problems. In the case of an orbital vehicle, if driven at a speed of 8 to 16 km, it stopped immediately when the braking system was applied. This caused South Koreans to ask, how can the vehicle injure the victim to the point of crushing? Why did marks appear on the road that seemed like they were caused by the sudden change of track in an accident?

Public reaction 
On June 26, 2002, many groups had protested in front of the U.S.' 2nd Infantry Division base. Some protestors cut the wire-fence. Furthermore, two reporters who went inside the station were locked up and assaulted by the U.S. soldiers. There was a lot of criticism toward the U.S. military in South Korea. The U.S. military chief of public affairs interviewed on the radio insisted that it was the Korean police who arrested the reporters. He also said that no one was responsible for the incident. This incited further anger in the South Korean citizens.

Candlelight vigils

First stage 

The 1st stage of the protest happened after the incident until November 30, 2002. The protests usually occurred in front of the U.S. military base or the U.S. embassy. Often, direct physical form of protest was prevalent such as attempts to enter the U.S. military base. People tried to publicize the incidents using online space more than regular broadcasting channels. The revision of the Status of the Forces Agreement (SOFA) was brought up not only to the public but also to politicians.

Second stage 
The 2nd stage started on November 30. Online, an anonymous person using the nickname "Angama" suggested that the public gather and do the candlelight protest in the Gwanghwamun and front of the City Hall. On November 30, 6pm more than 10,000 people gathered with the candles. After then, every weekend in downtown Seoul, people gathered and did the candlelight protest. Parents brought their children of all ages to the candlelight vigils. It was a peaceful demonstration. Middle school students and high school students have voluntarily participated. People made a speeches and sang the national anthems, as well as protest songs. Having music and dance performances, and festive atmosphere is the difference from the past mass protest which usually involved the physical clash with the police.

Impact of the social media  
The 2nd Stage of the candlelight vigils was the very first case that online collective act brought to the offline candlelight vigils. The public emotions of anger emerges, and participation through the internet community rapidly spread after the trial of the military vehicle driver, bringing participants to the candlelight vigils.

Third stage 
The 3rd stage started at the end of December through 2003 April. This stage had a different aspect from the former two stages. From the earlier of the year, the nuclear threats of North Korea brought a heated debate over the war crisis on the Korean Peninsula. Also, the U.S. government was preparing the Iraq war. Bush administration asked South Korean government to send a troop.

The 3rd Stage developed as an anti-war peace movement. Not only the commemorate the Hyosun-Misun, but the problems of anti-nuclear and anti-war have emerged within the protest leading groups. The focuses of the protest had been changed to opposition to the dispatch the troops to Iraq. After April in 2003, the popularity of the candlelight vigils seemed running out.

Aftermath

Anti-American Movement 

The incident contributed to Anti-American sentiments. In 2002, December 14, during the candlelight vigils, protesters tore the American flag in front of the City Hall. As a result, candlelight vigils evoke the Anti-American argument. Inside of the activist group, they tried not to be seen as Anti-Americanist, while protesting for the revision of the Status of the Forces Agreement (SOFA) and the anti-war movement.

In the entertainment industry, Anti-American movement was happening. Psy and Shin Hae-chul did the performance that smashed a model armored vehicle. Psy also did the silent prayer for the Hyosun and Misun. Also, KBS announcer Hwang Jung-min, who said, "I feel ashamed" during a news broadcast of anti-American protests, resigned as an announcer for KBS 2TV <News8> due to criticism from viewers.

Korean Government 
The South Korean government has provoked public outrage while dealing with the incident. The justice minister held a separate press conference, saying it is difficult to revise the SOFA.

The U.S. Government 

On September 21, 2002, the U.S. authorities set up a memorial near the site of the accident and also paid 200 million won worth of compensation to the bereaved families.

President George. W Bush sent the message through the U.S. ambassador to South Korea. It was a 'regret' at a time when the U.S. military's vehicle in Korea caused two middle school girls to be crushed to death after 5 months of the incident was happened. Nothing changed with the Status of the Forces Agreement (SOFA).

See also 
 South Korea-United States relations
 Status of forces agreement
 2008 US beef protest in South Korea
 2016–17 South Korean protests

References 

Protests in South Korea